Fort Chipewyan Airport  is located  northeast of Fort Chipewyan, Alberta, Canada.

Airlines and destinations

Passenger

See also
Fort Chipewyan/Small Lake Water Aerodrome

References

External links

Certified airports in Alberta
Transport in the Regional Municipality of Wood Buffalo